The 1984 Thayer Tutt Trophy was the second edition of the Thayer Tutt Trophy. It was held from March 20–29, 1984 in Briançon, Gap, Grenoble, and Villard-de-Lans, France. East Germany finished first, Switzerland finished second, and Romania finished third.

Results

Final table

References

External links
 Tournament on hockeyarchives.info

1983–84 in Asian ice hockey
Thayer Tutt Trophy
1983–84 in French ice hockey
1983
Sports competitions in Grenoble
20th century in Grenoble
March 1984 sports events in Europe